Porky in Wackyland is a 1938 Warner Bros. Looney Tunes animated short film, directed by Bob Clampett. The short was released on September 24, 1938, and stars Porky Pig venturing out to find the last do-do bird, which he finds in Wackyland, a land that makes no sense located in Darkest Africa.

In 1994, Porky in Wackyland was voted No. 8 of The 50 Greatest Cartoons of all time by members of the animation field. In 2000, it was deemed "culturally, historically, or aesthetically significant" by the United States Library of Congress, which selected the short for preservation in the National Film Registry.

Plot 

A newspaper shows Porky Pig traveling to Africa to hunt for the last do-do bird. Upon landing his airplane in Darkest Africa, Porky sees a sign telling him that he is in Wackyland, where anything can happen. He tiptoes along the ground in his airplane and is greeted by a roaring beast, who suddenly becomes effeminate and dances away into the forest.

A musical interlude introduces several more bizarre creatures that inhabit Wackyland's impossible landscape. These include a one-man band that plays its nose like a flute, a rabbit swinging in midair, a duck caricature of Al Jolson, and a beast with the heads of the Three Stooges. One creature wears a sandwich board advertising information about the do-do. The creature beckons Porky into a dark passage, where he falls down a chute and watches the do-do's big entrance. The do-do introduces itself and then tramples Porky while scat singing. Porky gives chase, but the do-do repeatedly uses surreal tricks to escape and humiliate him.

Some time later, the do-do encounters a creature selling newspapers announcing that Porky's hunt has been a success. Shocked by the news, the do-do drops its guard long enough for the creature (Porky in disguise) to grab it. Porky briefly celebrates catching the last do-do, but is bested again when the bird calls for its other do-do friends.

Voice cast 
Information is taken from the website Likely Looney, Mostly Merrie
Mel Blanc as various characters, including Porky Pig and Dodo
Billy Bletcher as the Roaring Goon
Tedd Pierce as mysterious voice
Dave Weber as the Prisoner
Bob Clampett as vocal effects

Reception 
Steve Schneider's 1998 That's All Folks! The Art of Warner Bros. Animation writes that with this short, "the lord of cartoon misrule, Clampett established conclusively that in animation, realism is irrelevant."

In the 2001 Masters of Animation, John Grant writes that "this short, in its cumulative effect, is more wildly inventive than anything even [Tex] Avery had produced for Warners."

Animation historian Steve Schneider writes, "No mere Looney Tune, Porky in Wackyland was Warner Bros. Emancipation Proclamation. Building on the creaky liberties inaugurated by director Tex Avery, here Bob Clampett scoffs and shreds the conventions — realism, literalism, infantilism, cutesiness, and worse — that, with the ascendancy of Disney, had come to caramelize cartooning. By reminding us of animations' horizons — namely, none at all — this anything-goes film illustrates Sigmund Freud's notion that humor arises from breaking taboos. And breaking taboos is something that animation, with its limitless freedom, is uniquely gifted to do."

Follow-ups and derivative works 

Much of the Wackyland sequence was adapted and reused by Clampett for inclusion in his 1943 short Tin Pan Alley Cats. A color remake of Porky in Wackyland was supervised by Friz Freleng in 1948. Re-titled as Dough for the Do-Do, the remake was released in 1949. The films were nearly identical, in many cases appearing to match frame-by-frame in certain details, albeit with Porky's appearance updated (by redoing most of the animation of the character), the voices having evolved (with less use of speeding-up) and the backgrounds being changed to a surreal, Daliesque landscape. 
Dough for the Do-Do was produced in Technicolor, but was originally released in Cinecolor due to a dispute with the Technicolor corporation. Later reissues were printed by Technicolor.

There were at least two Terrytoons plagiarizations of Porky in Wackyland in the 1940s or 50's. Dingbat Land (1949) starred Gandy Goose and Sourpuss. The role of the Do-Do was taken by a minor Terrytoons character, Dingbat. The second film, a more direct plagiarization of the Porky Pig/Do-Do cartoons, starred a British hunter and a Do-Do stand-in. The creature didn't talk, but made strange hooting noises, and flung flames from a tuft of hair on top of its head.

Tex Avery, for whom Clampett worked as an animator in the mid-1930s, borrowed strongly from this cartoon for his 1948 MGM cartoons Half-Pint Pygmy (in which the characters, George and Junior, travel to Africa in search of the world's smallest pygmy, only to discover that he has an uncle who's even smaller) and The Cat That Hated People (where the cat travels to the moon and encounters an array of characters similar to those in Clampett's Wackyland, e.g., a pair of gloves and lips that keep saying "Mammy, mammy", just like the Al Jolson duck in Porky in Wackyland). Clampett would again use the Three Stooges parody when a later creation of his, Beany and Cecil, faced the "Dreaded Three-Headed Threep".

According to writer Paul Dini, the Do-Do Bird is the father of Gogo Dodo, a character on the 1990s animated TV series Tiny Toon Adventures, and a second Wackyland is drawn into Acme acres by Babs and Buster Bunny. A small clip from the film was used in a Slappy Squirrel segment on another Warners animated TV series of the 1990s, Animaniacs. The segment, titled "Critical Condition", featured Porky in Wackyland as part of a fake LaserDisc release. The Do-Do Bird has made occasional guest spots in the DC Comics Looney Tunes comic book, being colored in grayscale as opposed to the rest of the art being in color. The character makes an appearance in the Wii game Looney Tunes: Acme Arsenal as an unplayable character. He is given a first name, Yoyo Dodo. Yoyo can also be seen at Maroon Cartoon Studios as a brief cameo in the beginning of the 1988 film Who Framed Roger Rabbit. Yoyo also made a cameo in the 2020 Looney Tunes Cartoons short "Happy Birthday, Bugs Bunny!".

See also 
 Looney Tunes and Merrie Melodies filmography (1929–1939)
 Looney Tunes and Merrie Melodies filmography (1940–1949)
 Looney Tunes Golden Collection Porky in Wackyland on Volume 2 (Disc 3) and Dough for the Do-Do on Volume 1 (Disc 2)

References

External links 
 
 

1938 films
1938 animated films
1938 comedy films
Films directed by Bob Clampett
Films set in Africa
Looney Tunes shorts
United States National Film Registry films
1930s American animated films
Animated films about birds
Porky Pig films
Films scored by Carl Stalling
Animated films about animals
Films about pigs
Dodo